Hatsuse Dam  is a gravity dam located in Kochi Prefecture in Japan. The dam is used for power production. The catchment area of the dam is 171.2 km2. The dam impounds about 21  ha of land when full and can store 1454 thousand cubic meters of water. The construction of the dam was started on 1935 and completed in 1937.

See also
List of dams in Japan

References

Dams in Kōchi Prefecture